The 1971 Brown Bears football team was an American football team that represented Brown University during the 1971 NCAA University Division football season. Brown lost every game and finished last in the Ivy League. 

In their fifth season under head coach Len Jardine, the Bears compiled a 0–9 record and were outscored 238 to 129. S. Bennett and F. Walsh were the team captains. 

The Bears' winless (0–7) conference record placed last in the Ivy League standings. They were outscored by Ivy opponents 162 to 86. 

Brown played its home games at Brown Stadium in Providence, Rhode Island.

Schedule

References

Brown
Brown Bears football seasons
College football winless seasons
Brown Bears football